Legarde or Le Garde or variant thereof, may refer to:

 Battle of Legarde (1940), a WWII battle near Lagarde, Moselle, France
 Fort Legarde, a star fort in Languedoc-Roussillon, France
 Legarde, a former township in Ontario, Canada
 The LeGarde Twins (born 1931), Tom Legarde and Ted Legarde, Australian musicians
 Christine Lagarde (born 1956), French lawyer, politician, and president of the European Central Bank
 Elias Legarde (1593-1670), aka Legardo, an early Jew in the American Colines

See also
 Garde (disambiguation)
 Lagarde (disambiguation)
 La Garde (disambiguation)
 Legard, a surname
 LGarde, a company